The seventeenth season of the Case Closed anime was directed by Masato Satō (until episode 504) and Kōjin Ochi (since episode 505) and produced by TMS Entertainment and Yomiuri Telecasting Corporation. The series is based on Gosho Aoyama's Case Closed manga series. In Japan, the series is titled . The North American English localization was titled Case Closed due to legal issues with the title Detective Conan. The series focuses on the adventures of teenage detective Shinichi Kudo who was turned into a child by a poison called APTX 4869, but continues working as a detective under the alias Conan Edogawa. At the start of the season, he works with the Federal Bureau of Investigation as they confront a criminal syndicate called the Black Organization before the episodes return to a more episodic formula.
 
The episodes use eight pieces of theme music: four opening themes and four ending themes. The third opening theme is "Mysterious" by Naifu until episode 520. The fourth opening theme is "Revive" by Mai Kuraki starting episode 521 and through episode 523. 

The second ending theme is "Summer Memories" by Aya Kamiki until episode 514. The third ending theme is "Go Your Own Way" by Yumi Shizukusa until episode 520.

The season initially ran from January 14, 2008, through February 2, 2009, on Nippon Television Network System in Japan. The English adaptation of the anime is licensed by Funimation Entertainment which has licensed the first one-hundred and four episodes. The season was later collected and released in ten DVD compilations by Shogakukan between September 26, 2008, and August 28, 2009, in Japan.



Episode list

Volume DVDs
Shogakukan released ten DVD compilations of the seventeenth season between September 26, 2008, and August 28, 2009, in Japan.

Notes and references
Notes
 The episode's numbering as followed in Japan
 The episodes were aired as a single hour-long episode in Japan

References

2008 Japanese television seasons
2009 Japanese television seasons
Season17